Doocy is a surname. Notable people with the surname include:

 Fred J. Doocy (1913–2017), American politician and banker
 Peter Doocy (born 1987), American television journalist
 Steve Doocy (born 1956), American political commentator